Eryx johnii is a species of nonvenomous snake in the subfamily Erycinae of the family Boidae. The species is endemic to Iran, Pakistan, and India. There are no subspecies which are recognized as being valid.

Common names include: Indian sand boa, John's sand boa, erutaley nagam, mannoli pambu, red sand boa, and brown sand boa.

Etymology
The specific name, johnii, is in honor of German naturalist Christoph Samuel John (1747–1813), who was a missionary in India from 1771 until his death.

Description

Adults of E. johnii rarely exceed  in total length (including tail), although they sometimes reach 3 feet (91 cm). Adapted to burrowing, the head is wedge-shaped with narrow nostrils and very small eyes. The body is cylindrical in shape with small polished dorsal scales. The tail, which is blunt, rounded, and not distinct from the body, appears truncated. Coloration varies from reddish brown to dull yellow-tan.

Geographic range
Eryx johnii is found from Iran through Pakistan into western, southern, and northwestern India. The type locality given is "Tranquebar" (Tanjore, Trichy, southeastern Tamil Nadu, India). and found in Indian desert. In western India, specifically state of Maharashtra, it is known as a Mandul snake (Marathi: मांडूळ साप).

Habitat
Eryx johnii is found in dry, semi-desert scrub plains and rocky dry foothills. It prefers loose sand, or sandy soil that crumbles easily, into which it burrows, living underground.

Diet
The diet of E. johnii consists mainly of mammals such as rats, mice, and other small rodents that are killed by constriction. Some specimens have apparently fed exclusively on other snakes.

Reproduction
Eryx johnii is ovoviviparous, with females giving birth to up to 14 young at a time in late summer to monsoon. It is very calm snake species.

Illegal trade
Eryx johnii has many superstitious beliefs attributed to it because of its double-headed appearance, such as bringing good luck, curing AIDS, etc. Such blind faith has resulted in endangering the species, and in illegal trade in India, despite being a protected species under Schedule IV of Wildlife Protection Act, 1972, of India.

References

Further reading

Boulenger GA (1890). The Fauna of British India, Including Ceylon and Burma. Reptilia and Batrachia. London: Secretary of State for India in Council. (Taylor and Francis, printers). xviii + 541 pp. (Eryx johnii, p. 248, Figure 76).
Boulenger GA (1893). Catalogue of the Snakes in the British Museum (Natural History). Volume I., Containing the Families ... Boidæ ... London: Trustees of the British Museum (Natural History). (Taylor and Francis, printers). xiii + 448 pp. + Plates I-XXVIII. (Eryx johnii, pp. 127–128).
Daniels JC (2002). The Book of Indian Reptiles and Amphibians. Oxford, United Kingdom: Oxford University Press. 252 pp. .
Das I (2002). A Photographic Guide to Snakes and other Reptiles of India. Sanibel Island, Florida: Ralph Curtis Books. 144 pp. . (Eryx johnii, p. 14).
Gray JE (1849). Catalogue of the Specimens of Snakes in the Collection of the British Museum. London: Trustees of the British Museum. (Edward Newman, printer). xv + 125 pp. (Clothonia johnii, pp. 110-111).
Günther ACLG (1864). The Reptiles of British India. London: The Ray Society. (Taylor & Francis, printers). xxvii + 452 pp. + Plates I-XXVI. (Eryx johnii, pp. 334-335).
Hallowell E (1848). Description of a species of Eryx from Madras. Proc. Acad. Nat. Sci., Philadelphia 1848: 184.
Russell P (1801). A Continuation of an Account of Indian Serpents; Containing Descriptions and Figures from Specimens and Drawings, Transmitted from Various Parts of India to the Hon. the Court of Directors of the East India Company [Volume 2]. London: East India Company. (W. Bulmer and Co., printers). v + 53 pp. + Plates I-LIV + index. (Boa johnii, new species, pp. 18–19 + Plate XVI).
Smith MA (1943). The Fauna of British India, Ceylon and Burma, Including the Whole of the Indo-Chinese Sub-region. Reptilia and Amphibia, Vol III.—Serpentes. London: Secretary of State for India. (Taylor and Francis, printers). xii + 583 pp. (Eryx johni johni'', pp. 113–114, Figure 35).

External links

 

johnii
Reptiles of Pakistan
Reptiles described in 1801